Marusia Bohuslavka was a legendary heroine who lived in Ukraine in the 16th or 17th century. She is primarily known from many Ukrainian epic ballads (dumas), usually referred to as Duma about Marusya Bohuslavka, and other Ukrainian folklore. Her nickname 'Bohuslavka' refers to her origin, the city of Bohuslav.

Legend
Marusya was kidnapped and sold into a Turkish harem. The duma tells how she earned the trust of her husband and gained access to the keys of the palace, including the prison. She used them to free a group of Ukrainian Cossacks who had been imprisoned for 30 years. However, she did not flee with them but remained in the harem since this was now the only life she knew.

In comments to the dumas about Marusya, her high status is compared to that of Roxelana.

References 

17th-century Ukrainian people
Ukrainian folklore
People from Bohuslav
Kobzarstvo
Folklore characters
Characters in epic poems
Slaves from the Ottoman Empire
16th-century slaves
17th-century slaves